Devon is a surname.

Those bearing it include:

Devon (1977–), adult film actress
 Richard Devon (1926–2010), American character actor
 Mari Devon (born 1960), American voice actress a.k.a. Jane Alan 
 Dayna Devon (born 1970)
 Lyn Devon (fl. c. 2000)

See also 
 Samuel Devons
 Ely Devons
 Charles Devens